Hubert du Plessis (7 June 1922 – 12 March 2011) was a South African composer, pianist, and professor of music whose career spanned several decades. Along with Arnold van Wyk and Stefans Grové, du Plessis was one of the foremost South African composers of the 20th century.

Biography
Hubert du Plessis was born to an Afrikaner family on a farm called Groenrivier in Malmesbury in the Western Cape on 7 June 1922. A musical prodigy from a young age, he began writing his own piano compositions by the time he was seven years old. In 1940 he enrolled in Stellenbosch University, becoming the first student at the university to graduate with a Bachelor of Music degree.

In 1943 he briefly worked for the South African Broadcasting Company in Cape Town, but soon after accepted a position with the department of music at Rhodes University, where he became a lecturer. From 1951 to 1954, he studied at the Royal Academy of Music in London, and upon his return to South Africa he accepted a teaching position at Stellenbosch University, quickly becoming senior lecturer of the music department. In 1963 he was honored for his musical contributions by the South African Academy of Science and Art (commonly known as Die Akademie).

Du Plessis' compositions were varied and included both choral and instrumental pieces. He is noted for his contributions to both South African chamber music and orchestral music. Initially opposed to the idea, du Plessis included Afrikaans folk music in some of his later compositions. In the 1960s, he composed some nationalist works, which were endorsed by the National Party government, which he actively supported. He attributed his nationalistic music to a "growing consciousness" of his Afrikaner heritage, and therefore was not opposed to his music being used for political purposes.

Despite the strict laws against homosexuality in Apartheid South Africa, du Plessis was spared public disgrace and legal troubles by the government, and lived unashamedly as an outspoken and openly gay man. He appeared in front of the South African Parliament to campaign against tightening of anti-homosexuality laws in the late 1960s.

He died at his home in Stellenbosch on 12 March 2011 at the age of 88.

Works by genre

Piano 
 Vier klavierstukke, op. 1, 1944-1945 (1. Prelude, 2. Studie, 3. Elegie, 4. Dans)
 Ses minature, op. 3, 1945-1949
 Sonate no.1, op. 8, 1952
 Sonate vir klavierduet, op. 10, 1954 "Composed for H. Ferguson and D. Matthews"
 Cunctipotens genitor Deus, fantasie oor ’n 11de-eeuse organum, 1956
 Prelude, fuga en postludium, op. 17, 1958
 Sewe preludes, op. 18, 1964
 Inspiré par mes chats, suite, op. 27.  (1. Déplotarion sur la mort de Dodo, 2. L’allégresse et la sagesse de Josquin, 3. Les petits pas amoureux de Tristan, 4. La tendresse d’Isolde, 5. Gaspard et sa souris, pas de deux, 6. Tombeau de Joséphine)
 Vier klavierstukke, op. 28 in opdrag van UNISA, 1964 (1. Hommage à Fauré, 2. Hommage à Ravel, 3. Hommage à Chopin, 4. Hommage à François Couperin)
 When I was a child-Toe ek ’n kind was, suite, op. 33, 1972 (1. Speeldoos, 2. Die tjellis, 3. Vleivolk, 4. Klawerliefde, 5. Rivierdroom, 6. Die skool sluit, 7. Kaleidoskoop, 8. Naggeluide)
 Sonate no. 2, op. 40, in opdrag van SAMRO, 1974-1975.
 Tien klavierwerke vir kinders en jongmense, op. 41, 1975 (Afd. I (vir kinders): 1. Heimwee van ’n Amerikaanse teddiebeer, 2. Angus en oom Koos maak maats, 3. Wispelturige Wilhelmina, 4. Ouboet en Kleinboet voel olik, 5. In die pretpark Afd. II (vir jongmense): 6. Hartseerwals, 7. Kwêla, 8. Mars, 9. Studie, 10. Scherzo)

Harp 
 Variasies op ’n volkswysie, vir harpsolo, op. 31, 1967-1968

Chamber music 
 Strykkwartet, op. 13, 1957
 Trio vir klavier, viool en tjello, op. 20, for the SABC, 1957-1960
 Drie stukke vir fluit en klavier, op. 25, 1962-1963 (1. Sarabande, 2. Wals, 3. Wiegelied)
 Vier antieke danse vir fluit en klavesimbel, op. 35 (1. Siciliano, 2. Tambourin, 3. Sarabande, 4. Gigue)
 Sonate vir altviool en klavier, op. 43, 1977

Orchestral 
 Simfonie in a, op. 14, 1953-1954
 Musiek by drie skilderye van Henri Rousseau, op. 24, for the SABC, 1962 (1. Un soir de carnaval, 2. Pour fêter le bébé, 3. Le rêve)
 Die Stem van Suid-Afrika, for the SABC, 1960
 Vallée d’Obermann (Liszt) 1961
 Drie outas het in die haai Karoo, for the SABC, 1973

Other music 
 Huberta the hippo (hoorbeeld deur Cecil Jubber), 1960
 Periandos van Korinte (Opperman), 1972

References

1922 births
2011 deaths
20th-century classical composers
Afrikaner nationalists
South African composers
South African male composers
LGBT classical composers
South African LGBT musicians
Gay composers
White South African people
Alumni of the Royal Academy of Music
Male classical composers
20th-century male musicians
Stellenbosch University alumni
South African expatriates in the United Kingdom